Uzbekistan made its Paralympic Games début at the 2004 Summer Paralympics in Athens, with a single representative (Yusup Kadyrov) in powerlifting. Competing in the men's up to 75 kg category, Kadyrov failed to lift a weight. In the 2008 Summer Paralympics, Uzbekistan sent two competitors: a powerlifter and a swimmer, they failed to win any medals again.

In 2012 Summer Paralympics in London, Sharif Khalilov won Uzbekistan's first medal: a silver medal in judo in men's -73 kg event. Uzbekistan's most successful Paralympic Games' result was in 2016 in Rio de Janeiro where they won a total of 31 medals and were in the top 20 in the medal table.

Uzbekistan took part in the 2014 Winter Paralympics and 2018 Winter Paralympics but haven't won any medals.

Medals

Medals by Summer Games

Medals by Winter Games

Medals by Summer Sport

Medals by Winter Sport

Medalists

See also
 Uzbekistan at the Olympics
 Uzbekistan at the Asian Games

References

 
Paralympics